Morgan Schiff & Co. was an investment house founded by Phillip Ean Cohen which was a prominent Mergers and Acquisitions and Private Equity firm from its founding in the mid-1980s to the late 1990s. The firm was discontinued after the bankruptcy of Friedman's Inc., the largest jewelry bankruptcy of all time.

The firm was named after Jacob Schiff and J.P. Morgan although the firm had no affiliation with either individual.

History 
After a power struggle with Jeff Beck, Phillip Ean Cohen left Oppenheimer & Co. to start his own firm. Cohen was offered $1 billion seed funding from Michael Milken, but refused. Despite this, Morgan Schiff initially operated as the Private Equity arm for Drexel Burnham Lambert, and was located directly under Milken's office. Cohen decided to name his firm after two important historical figures on Wall Street, despite their complete lack of affiliation with the firm. When Business Week asked Cohen about the name he replied, "It was my belief that investment banks should go back to advising clients in a closer format, as in the days of JP Morgan and Jacob Schiff."  Cohen was considered one of the top minds in Mergers and Acquisitions, and was able to recruit many of his corporate clients from his days at Kuhn Loeb, Lehman Brothers, First Boston, Oppenheimer, and Drexel Burnham Lambert.  One of these clients was Zale Corporation, which used Morgan Schiff as an adviser on a $500 million Merger, officially becoming the company's first transaction. 

In 1986, despite only having 12 employees and just two partners, Morgan Schiff was one of the 50 largest Mergers and Acquisitions firms in the world The firm continued to grow eventually opening an office in San Francisco. Morgan Schiff suffered a major set back when one of its largest portfolio companies Friedman's Inc. declared bankruptcy after an SEC investigation found that the company's CEO and CFO lied about the liquidity of their short term customer loan program. The firm eventually closed its doors in 2004.

Art dealer Andy Valmorbida worked at the firm before establishing his gallery.

Former Portfolio Companies/ Clients 
Zale Corporation
Friedman's Inc.
EZCorp
Crescent Jewelers
Farm Journal - http://agweb.com/FarmJournal/default.aspx
AgWeb - http://agweb.com/
Petro - http://www.petro.com/
Tab Products- 
Hamilton Sorter - http://www.hamiltonsorter.com/
Pietrefesa Corporation
Telecom Corporation
Rthport
Cherry Tree
Maxcell- http://www.maxcellinnerduct.com/
Triboro
AMC Theatres

Unaffiliated individuals

Sources

External links

Drexel Burnham Lambert
American companies established in 1984
Financial services companies established in 1984
Financial services companies disestablished in 2004
Former investment banks of the United States
Private equity firms of the United States
Investment banking private equity groups
Defunct companies based in New York City
2004 disestablishments in the United States